Trichodes crabroniformis is a beetle species of checkered beetles belonging to the family Cleridae, subfamily Clerinae. It can be found on Sicily and Crete, as well as in Near East, Kosovo, Montenegro, Serbia, and Voivodina.

References

crabroniformis
Beetles of Europe
Beetles described in 1787